Nesiodostomia quarta is a species of sea snail, a marine gastropod mollusk in the family Pyramidellidae, the pyrams and their allies.

Description
The cylindric shell is tapering towards its apex.  Its length measures 3.4 mm. The smooth and glossy shell has a cinnamon color. The protoconch is large and hemispherical. The 5½  whorls of the teleoconch are nearly flat. The sutures are narrowly impressed. The subsutural margin is defined by an indistinct line in the color of the shell. The body whorl is tapering below. The aperture is almost shaped like a pear. The columella is very short and concave. The outer lip is tapering outward in the middle.

Distribution
This species occurs in the Pacific Ocean off Hawaii.

References

External links
 To World Register of Marine Species

Pyramidellidae
Gastropods described in 1918